ST Camelopardalis is a carbon star in the constellation of Camelopardalis.

Variability
ST Cam is a semiregular variable star. It is doubly periodic, with the two pulsation periods P0 and P1 being equal to 368.6 and 201 days respectively.

References

Carbon stars
Camelopardalis (constellation)
Camelopardalis, ST
Semiregular variable stars
022552
030243
Durchmusterung objects